The 1911 Chicago International Aviation Meet (August 12 to August 20, 1911) was major aviation show held at Grant Park in Chicago, Illinois, United States in August 1911.

Lincoln Beachey set a world altitude record of 11,642 feet at the meet.

William R. Badger and St. Croix Johnstone both died in aviation accidents at the meet.  The wings on Badger's biplane collapsed when he tried to pull out of dive too late, and Johnstone crashed into Lake Michigan after his engine failed.

References

Aviation competitions and awards
1911 in aviation
August 1911 events
1911 in Illinois
Aviation in Illinois
Aviation history of the United States